A sequence in biology is the one-dimensional ordering of monomers, covalently linked within a biopolymer; it is also referred to as the primary structure of a biological macromolecule. While it can refer to many different molecules, the term sequence is most often used to refer to a DNA sequence.

See also
 Protein sequence
 DNA sequence
 Genotype
 Self-incompatibility in plants
 List of geneticists
 Human Genome Project
 Dot plot (bioinformatics)
 Multiplex Ligation-dependent Probe Amplification
 Sequence analysis

Molecular biology